The 2016 BOSS GP season was the 22nd season of the BOSS GP series. The championship began on 17 April at Hockenheim and finished on 10 October at Imola.

Teams and Drivers

Calendar

Championship standings
 Points for both championships were awarded as follows:

Drivers Standings

External links
 

Boss GP
Boss GP